Igam is a small area in what is now Afghanistan just west of Sanginah. Named by the Persian Empire during the reign of Deioces (728BC-675BC). Considered to be a Holy site for prophetic theories, Deioces built a shrine in 719BC to the honor of "Igam". Igam was prophesied by Zoroaster (Around 1200BC).

Zoroaster believed these stars would descend unto Earth and sleep in the womb of a woman. He went even as far as to describe the Earthly parents of the prophetic stars. That they would descend into woman and be born as children. Unto Leviathan and a Scion. The accounts were later written about by the Father Sebastien Michaelis.

During the rule of Astyages (585BC - 550BC) the shrines and the temples were destroyed.

Historical regions of Afghanistan